James Blair ( 1788 – 9 September 1841) was a Scots-Irish owner of plantations in the West Indies. He entered Parliament as a Tory in 1818 to protect the interests of slave-owners.
Blair sat in the House of Commons from 1818 to 1830, and later from 1837 to 1841.

When slave-owners were compensated for the abolition of slavery in British colonies in 1833, Blair received the biggest single compensation payment.

Early life
Blair was the son of John Blair of County Armagh in Ireland. However, his family came from Wigtownshire in Scotland, and their business interests were there.

Career as a planter and slave holder
In 1815, his father's brother Lambert Blair left his South American estates jointly to James Blair and his cousin John MacEamon (or MacCamon). These included sugar and cotton plantations in Berbice, Demerara and Surinam.

In 1833, Parliament passed the Slavery Abolition Act, which abolished slavery throughout the British Empire. The Act reconciled two central principles of 19th-century classical liberalism – human liberty and private property – by paying compensation to slave-owners for the loss of their property. The sum allocated in the Act was £20 million, which amounted to 40% of the United Kingdom's annual budget. Owners submitted separate claims for their slave-holdings on separate plantations, and the largest single claim came from Blair. (Others such as John Gladstone made multiple claims which reached a higher total.) For the 1,598 slaves he owned on the Blairmont plantation he had inherited in British Guyana, Blair was awarded £83,530 8shilling and 11pennies

Career in Parliament
At the 1818 general election, Blair bought a seat in Parliament, in the rotten borough of Saltash in Devon. That seat was bought for one Parliament only from Michael George Prendergast, who had purchased a life interest from the borough's owner James Buller.

At the 1820 general election, Blair was returned for another rotten borough, this time Aldeburgh in Suffolk. It was owned by the Lancashire ironmaster Samuel Walker, who had bought it in 1818 for £39,000 (equivalent to £ in ).

Blair had entered Parliament to defend the slave plantations, and while he voted on conventional Tory lines, he did not speak in the Commons until March 1824, in the debates which followed the Demerara rebellion of 1823. He opposed measures to improve the living and working conditions of slaves. He told the house that the slaves were "as mildly and as humanely managed in Demerara, as in the Islands, or as is compatible with a state of slavery and pressure" and that "there can be no doubt that the revolt in Demerara is to be attributed to the debates which took place in this House last year, and to the notice preceding them". His only other contribution to Parliamentary debates was in 1825, when he supported retaining the preferential tariff on sugar imported from the West Indies. He had been an active member of the London Society of West India Planters and Merchants, attending 33 meetings between 1824 -1829.

Walker's interest in Aldeburgh had been sold in 1822, and at the 1826 election Blair was returned for Minehead in the Fownes Luttrell interest. He continued to take a Tory line, voting against repeal of the Test Acts, against Jewish emancipation, and against Catholic emancipation.

He stood down at the 1830 general election, with hopes of a seat in Wigtownshire. However, he did not return to the Commons for seven years.

Blair did not contest the Wigtownshire seat until 1835, when he was defeated by the incumbent Sir Andrew Agnew, Bt. Agnew retired at the 1837 election, when Blair won the seat by 362 votes to 314 of the Whig Alexander Murray. At the general election in August, Blair lost his seat to the Whig John Hamilton Dalrymple.

Personal life
In 1815, he married Elizabeth Catherine Stopford, youngest daughter of Lieutenant-General Hon Edward Stopford. In 1825, he bought the Penninghame estate in Wigtownshire from a merchant whose business had failed. The estate included the lands of Penninghame, Castle Stewart and Fintalloch.

Death
Blair died less than a month after his defeat in the 1841 election at about age fifty-three.
His will ran to 46 pages and made many bequests, to a total value of £300,000 (equivalent to £ in ).

The bulk of his wealth, including the Penninghame estate, was bequeathed to his brother-in-law William Henry Stopford, a Colonel in the Royal Artillery. In 1842, Colonel Stopford changed his name to Stopford-Blair, and incorporated the Blair coat of arms in his own.

References

External links 
 
 

1780s births
Year of birth uncertain
1841 deaths
People from County Armagh
People from Dumfries and Galloway
Tory MPs (pre-1834)
Members of the Parliament of the United Kingdom for English constituencies
Members of the Parliament of the United Kingdom for Scottish constituencies
UK MPs 1818–1820
UK MPs 1820–1826
UK MPs 1826–1830
UK MPs 1837–1841
Scottish Tory MPs (pre-1912)
Scottish businesspeople
19th-century Irish businesspeople
Sugar plantation owners
British slave owners
Scottish slave owners
Ulster Scots people
Recipients of payments from the Slavery Abolition Act 1833